Lena Marie Eliasson (born July 22, 1981) is a Swedish orienteering and ski-orienteering competitor.
She received a bronze medal in sprint at the World Orienteering Championships in Kyiv in 2007.

She received a silver medal in the Junior World Ski Orienteering Championships in 2001.

References

External links

1981 births
Living people
Swedish orienteers
Female orienteers
Foot orienteers
Ski-orienteers
World Orienteering Championships medalists